The East Kerry Senior Football Championship is a Gaelic football competition for teams affiliated to the East Kerry division. Most adult clubs in the division compete for this cup, even if they are playing at junior or intermediate grades.
In recent years, the competition has been dominated by Dr Crokes, who won their thirtieth championship in December 2018. The winners receive the Dr O'Donoghue Cup. The main sponsor for many years is the Gleneagle Hotel in Killarney.

Roll of honour

Dr Crokes won the 1927 East Kerry Championship.

References

External links
 East Kerry GAA website
  2011 Final report

Gaelic football competitions in County Kerry